Princess Margaret Hospital may refer to:

 Princess Margaret Cancer Centre, Toronto
 Princess Margaret Hospital (Hong Kong), a major acute general hospital in Kwai Chung, Hong Kong
 Princess Margaret Hospital, Christchurch
 Princess Margaret Hospital for Children, Perth, Australia
 Princess Margaret Hospital (Roseau), Roseau, Dominica
 Princess Margaret Hospital, Funafuti, Funafuti atoll, Tuvalu
 Princess Margaret Hospital, Nassau, Bahamas
 Princess Margaret Hospital, Windsor, UK
 Princess Margaret Hospital, St. Thomas Parish, Jamaica

See also
 Princess Margaret (disambiguation)
 PMH (disambiguation)